Paul Lederer is the former CEO of Primo Group, and Chairman and co-owner of A-League club Western Sydney Wanderers.

Business
Lederer started his professional career by joining his uncle's manufacturing business in his early twenties. In 1985, Andrew Lederer started Primo Smallgoods by buying the Mayfair ham factory in Sydney and Paul Lederer became one of the first 38 new employees. Lederer inherited Primo Smallgoods when his uncle died in 2004. Between 2004 and 2015, Lederer served as CEO of Primo Smallgoods, until the company was sold in 2015 to JBS for 1.45 billion.

Lederer now heads the privately-owned Lederer Group. Since 2015 the Lederer Group has built a commercial property portfolio and has interests in dairy manufacture and supply.

Western Sydney Wanderers FC
In May 2014 Lederer was part of a four-member consortium that bought the licence to operate the Western Sydney Wanderers FC from 30 June 2014. In 2018, Lederer was elected the new chairman of the Australian Professional Football Club Association.

In 1986, Lederer's uncle, Andrew, was awarded the Medal of the Order of Australia for service to soccer.

Personal life 
Lederer is married to Eva Marie and they have two children.

Net worth 
In 2014,  the Business Review Weekly (BRW) Rich List assessed Lederer's net worth as 635 million. and in 2017 his net worth was assessed as 824 million. In 2020, The Australian Financial Review Rich List assessed Lederer's net worth as 1.36 billion; and increased to 1.39 billion in 2021.

References

Living people
A-League Men executives
Year of birth missing (living people)
Hungarian emigrants to Australia
Australian business executives
Australian billionaires